George Lyall (born 4 May 1947) is a Scottish professional footballer, who played for Raith Rovers in the Scottish Football League, and  Preston North End, Nottingham Forest and Hull City in the Football League.

References

1947 births
Living people
Sportspeople from Highland (council area)
Scottish footballers
Scottish Football League players
English Football League players
Raith Rovers F.C. players
Preston North End F.C. players
Nottingham Forest F.C. players
Hull City A.F.C. players
Scarborough F.C. players
Association football midfielders